Mister G may refer to:

 King Gustaf V of Sweden, playing tennis under the pseudonym Mister G
 Mister G (children's performer)
 Mr G, a fictional character in Summer Heights High portrayed by Chris Lilley
 Mr g, a 2012 novel by Alan Lightman

See also
 Gee (surname)